Asya and the Hen with the Golden Eggs, or Ryaba, My Chicken (translit. Kurochka Ryaba) is a 1994 Russian comedy film directed by Andrei Konchalovsky. It was entered into the 1994 Cannes Film Festival.

Asya and the Hen with the Golden Eggs is a satirical sequel to Konchalovsky's 1966 Soviet film, The Story of Asya Klyachina, taking the characters of the original and placing them in a post-Soviet context.

Cast
 Inna Churikova as Asya
 Viktor Mikhaylov as Vasili Nikitich
 Aleksandr Surin as Stepan
 Gennady Yegorychev as Chirkunov
 Gennady Nazarov as Seryozha
 Mikhail Kislov as Grishka
 Mikhail Kononov as father Nikodim
 Lyubov Sokolova  as Maria
 Aleksandr Chislov  as secretary
 Andrei Konchalovsky as customer in a hairdressing salon (uncredited)

References

External links

1994 films
1994 comedy films
Russian comedy films
1990s Russian-language films
Films directed by Andrei Konchalovsky